Tetrahydropalmatine (THP) is an isoquinoline alkaloid found in several different plant species, mainly in the genus Corydalis (Yan Hu Suo), but also in other plants such as Stephania rotunda. These plants have traditional uses in Chinese herbal medicine. The pharmaceutical industry has synthetically produced the more potent enantiomer Levo-tetrahydropalmatine (Levo-THP), which has been marketed worldwide under different brand names as an alternative to anxiolytic and sedative drugs of the benzodiazepine group and analgesics such as opiates. It is also sold as a dietary supplement.

In 1940, a Vietnamese scientist Sang Dinh Bui extracted an alkaloid from the root of Stephania rotunda with the yield of 1.2 - 1.5% and he named this compound rotundine. From 1950 to 1952, two Indian scientists studied and extracted from Stephania glabra another alkaloid named hyndanrine.  In 1965, the structure of rotundine and hyndarin was proved to be the same as tetrahydropalmatine.

Effects 

Tetrahydropalmatine has been demonstrated to possess analgesic effects and may be beneficial in the treatment of heart disease and liver damage. It is a blocker of voltage-activated L-type calcium channel active potassium channels. It is a potent muscle relaxant. It has also shown potential in the treatment of drug addiction to both cocaine and opiates, and preliminary human studies have shown promising results.

The pharmacological profile of l-THP includes antagonism of dopamine D1, and D2 receptors as well as actions at dopamine D3, alpha adrenergic and serotonin receptors. The Ki values for l-THP at D1 and D2 dopamine receptors are approximately 124 nM (D1) and 388 nM (D2). In addition to the antagonism of post-synaptic dopamine receptors, the blockade of pre-synaptic autoreceptors by l-THP results in increased dopamine release, and it has been suggested that lower affinity of l-THP for D2 receptors may confer some degree of autoreceptor selectivity. Along with dopamine receptors, l-THP has been reported to interact with a number of other receptor types, including alpha-1 adrenergic receptors, at which it functions as an antagonist, and GABA-A receptors, through positive allosteric modulation. Additionally, l-THP displays significant binding to 5-HT1A and alpha-2 adrenergic receptors. In the case of 5-HT1A receptors, l-THP binds with a Ki of approximately 340 nM.

Animal experiments have shown that the sedative effect of THP results from blocking dopaminergic neurons in the brain. Dopamine is an important neurotransmitter in the central nervous system where it occurs in several important signaling systems that regulate muscular activity and attention, as well as feelings of joy, enthusiasm, and creativity. Therefore, THP causes no feelings of euphoria, and has been seen as an alternative to addictive drugs for people suffering from anxiety and pain, and as a possibility for relief for people not helped by existing drugs.

Cases of poisoning 
Several cases of poisoning related to THP have been reported. These cases involved negative effects on respiration, cardiac activity, and the nervous system. In addition, chronic hepatitis has been reported, caused by THP production in East Asia under conditions that were insufficiently sterile. Fatalities started to be reported in 1999 in cases where THP had been used in combination with other drugs having analgesic and anti-anxiety effects. All 1999 deaths could be tied to a single THP-based supplement, sold under the name "Jin Bu Huan Anodyne Tablets". This product was therefore blacklisted by US and European health authorities. In some other countries, such as Singapore, THP is treated as a controlled substance, and license is required to sell it.

See also

References

External links 
Introduction to Rotundine

Adrenergic receptor modulators
Alpha-1 blockers
Benzylisoquinoline alkaloids
D1 antagonists
D2 antagonists
Dopamine receptor modulators
GABAA receptor positive allosteric modulators
Ion channel blockers
Phenol ethers
Plant toxins
Serotonin receptor modulators